Kawamata Tsuneyuki (b. ) was a Japanese ukiyo-e artist and founder of the Kawamata school of art.  Like many early ukiyo-e artists, Tsuneyuki and his school specialized in painting (nikuhitsu-ga) rather than designing woodblock prints.

Tsuneyuki's active period was from the Kyōhō (1716–36) to the Kanpō (1741–44) eras.  Something more than twenty paintings identified as his survive.  They tend to be sharply outlined, florid paintings of elegant women, apparently influenced by the work of Miyagawa Chōshun.

The Inoue Kazuo edition of the Ukiyo-e Ruikō dates a work of Inoue's to 1741 and states he was 65 at the time, from which a birth year of 1677 is assumed.  Tsuneyuki's date of death is unknown.  One of his students was Kawamata Tsunemasa.

References

Works cited

External links
 
 Kawamata Tsuneyuki at ukiyo-e.org

1677 births
Ukiyo-e artists
Year of death unknown